The 2010 Chrono des Nations was the 29th edition of the Chrono des Nations cycle race and was held on 17 October 2010. The race started and finished in Les Herbiers. The race was won by David Millar.

General classification

References

2010
2010 in road cycling
2010 in French sport
October 2010 sports events in France